A499 may refer to:

 A499 road (Wales)
 RFA Salvestor (A499), a ship